The Stygnopsidae are a small family of harvestmen, with almost all species found in Mexico.

Name
The name of the type genus Stygnopsis is combined from the genus Stygnus (Stygnidae) and Ancient Greek opsis, "looks like".

Description
The body length of these harvestmen ranges from 2.5 (Karos) to 7 mm (Hoplobunus). Their color ranges from dark brown to black, with much lighter appendages. Cave-dwelling species are pale light brown.

Distribution
As in other Laniatores, most species have narrow distributions. Almost all species occur in Mexico, with some found in the southern USA (Hoplobunus), and Guatemala, El Salvador and Belize (Paramitraceras).

Relationships

Epedanidae could be the sister group to Gonyleptoidea sensu lato (including the Assamiidae), with the Stygnopsidae the sister group to the rest of Gonyleptoidea. Although they reach into the Nearctic, they are more closely related to neotropical harvestmen.

Species

 Hoplobunus Banks, 1900
 Hoplobunus apoalensis Goodnight & Goodnight, 1973 — Mexico
 Hoplobunus barretti Banks, 1900 — Mexico
 Hoplobunus boneti (Goodnight & Goodnight, 1942) — cave, Mexico
 Hoplobunus madlae Goodnight & Goodnight, 1967 — Texas
 Hoplobunus mexicanus (Roewer, 1915) — Mexico
 Hoplobunus mexicanus (Sørensen, 1932) — praeoccuppied; Mexico
 Hoplobunus oaxacensis Goodnight & Goodnight, 1973 — Mexico
 Hoplobunus osorioi (Goodnight & Goodnight, 1944) — Mexico
 Hoplobunus planus Goodnight & Goodnight, 1973 — Mexico
 Hoplobunus queretarius Silhavy 1974 — Mexico
 Hoplobunus russelli Goodnight & Goodnight, 1967 — Texas
 Hoplobunus spinooculorum Goodnight & Goodnight, 1973 — Mexico
 Hoplobunus zullinii Silhavy 1977 — Mexico

 Karos Goodnight & Goodnight, 1944 — Mexico
 Karos barbarikos Goodnight & Goodnight, 1944
 Karos brignolii Silhavy 1974
 Karos depressus Goodnight & Goodnight, 1971
 Karos dybasi (Goodnight & Goodnight, 1947)
 Karos foliorum (Goodnight & Goodnight, 1945)
 Karos gratiosus Goodnight & Goodnight, 1971
 Karos parvus Goodnight & Goodnight, 1971
 Karos projectus Goodnight & Goodnight, 1971
 Karos rugosus Goodnight & Goodnight, 1971
 Karos tuberculatus (Goodnight & Goodnight, 1944)
 Karos unispinosus (Goodnight & Goodnight, 1946)

 Mexotroglinus Silhavy, 1977
 Mexotroglinus sbordonii Silhavy, 1977 — Mexico

 Paramitraceras F. O. P-Cambridge, 1905
 Paramitraceras femoralis Goodnight & Goodnight, 1953 — Mexico
 Paramitraceras granulatus F. O. Pickard-Cambridge, 1905 — Guatemala, El Salvador, Mexico
 Paramitraceras hispidulus F. O. Pickard-Cambridge, 1905 — Guatemala, Belize, Mexico

 Sbordonia Silhavy 1977 — Mexico
 Sbordonia armigera Silhavy 1977
 Sbordonia parvula (Goodnight & Goodnight, 1953)

 Stygnopsis Sørensen, 1902 — Mexico
 Stygnopsis robusta (Goodnight & Goodnight, 1971)
 Stygnopsis valida (Sørensen, 1884)

 Tampiconus Roewer, 1949
 Tampiconus philippii Roewer, 1949 — Mexico

 Troglostygnopsis Silhavy, 1974 — Mexico
 Troglostygnopsis anophthalma Silhavy, 1974
 Troglostygnopsis inops (Goodnight & Goodnight, 1971)

Footnotes

References
 Joel Hallan's Biology Catalog: Stygnopsidae
  (2003): Annotated catalogue of the Laniatores of the New World (Arachnida, Opiliones). Revista Ibérica de Aracnología vol. especial monográfico 1: 1-337.
  (eds.) (2007): Harvestmen - The Biology of Opiliones. Harvard University Press 

Harvestmen
Harvestman families